Digital Assembly LLC is a privately owned software company based in the downtown area of New York City, United States.  It develops data recovery and computer forensics software for Microsoft Windows, which currently include Adroit Photo Recovery, and Adroit Photo Forensics. More products are expected to be released in the future. Digital Assembly was featured in a NY Times article that covered its unique recovery technology.

In the United Kingdom, Digital Assembly Ltd is a web application development company that specialises in Java technologies and Oracle databases. 
Digital Assembly Ltd develops scalable dynamic websites, e-commerce systems, bespoke Web Content Management Systems, mobile applications, Cloud applications, are specialists in SCORM and develop corporate Learning Management Systems for e-learning. Digital Assembly Ltd in the United Kingdom is not associated with Digital Assembly LLC in the United States.

History 
Digital Assembly LLC was established on 3 May 2006 at Brooklyn, New York City, United States and ceased operations on 10 February 2015.

References

External links 
 Digital Assembly (United Kingdom) Homepage
 Digital Assembly (United States) Homepage
 Adroit Photo Recovery page
 Adroit Photo Forensics page

Software companies based in New York City
Privately held companies based in New York City
Software companies established in 2006
2006 establishments in New York City
Defunct software companies of the United States